Caileigh Filmer (born December 18, 1996) is a Canadian national representative rower, an Olympian and a 2018 world champion.

Caileigh graduated from Mount Douglas Secondary in 2014 and started at University of California in fall of 2014. 
She won a bronze medal at the 2014 Summer Youth Olympics in the coxless pair event alongside Larissa Werbicki.

She represented Canada in the Rowing World Cup I and Rowing World Cup II in the women's pair in 2016 and then was selected to represent Canada at the 2016 Summer Olympics in the women's eight event. Her crew placed fifth in the Olympic final.

She was the 2018 world champion in the women's coxless pair winning her title with Hillary Janssens at the 2018 World Rowing Championships in Plovdiv.

She represented Canada at the 2020 Summer Olympics.

References

External links

1996 births
Living people
Canadian female rowers
Rowers from Victoria, British Columbia
Rowers at the 2014 Summer Youth Olympics
Rowers at the 2016 Summer Olympics
Olympic rowers of Canada
World Rowing Championships medalists for Canada
California Golden Bears athletes
Rowers at the 2020 Summer Olympics
Medalists at the 2020 Summer Olympics
Olympic medalists in rowing
Olympic bronze medalists for Canada
Youth Olympic bronze medalists for Canada
21st-century Canadian women